Heping Township (Mandarin: 和平乡) is a township in Huangyuan County, Xining, Qinghai, China. In 2010, Heping Township had a total population of 13,628: 7,220 males and 6,408 females: 2,444 aged under 14, 10,243 aged between 15 and 65 and 941 aged over 65.

References 

Township-level divisions of Qinghai
Xining